Rodrigo Braga Menezes (born 9 August 1988) is a Brazilian footballer who plays as a midfielder for Luziânia. In 2014 he had his only experience outside Brazil playing in Romania for Liga I club Universitatea Cluj.

References

1988 births
Living people
Brazilian footballers
Association football midfielders
Campeonato Brasileiro Série D players
Liga I players
Oeste Futebol Clube players
Esporte Clube Pelotas players
J. Malucelli Futebol players
Sobradinho Esporte Clube players
Comercial Futebol Clube (Ribeirão Preto) players
FC Universitatea Cluj players
Galícia Esporte Clube players
Esporte Clube Noroeste players
Associação Atlética Luziânia players
Clube Esportivo Lajeadense players
Brazilian expatriate footballers
Expatriate footballers in Romania
Brazilian expatriate sportspeople in Romania